Surbiton was a borough constituency created for the 1955 general election and abolished for the 1997 general election, in Surrey until 1965 and thereafter in outer south-west London. It returned one Member of Parliament (MP) to the House of Commons of the Parliament of the United Kingdom by the first past the post system of election.

History
This was in the safe/marginal seat spectrum irrefutably a safe Conservative seat during its 32-year lifetime.  The party positioned in second position was also unchanged until it changed once in the course of the seat's history.  The election when this change took place was the 1983 United Kingdom general election.  The narrowest majority  was the General Election 1966 at 15.7%.

Boundaries 
1955–1974: The Municipal Borough of Surbiton.

1974–1983: The London Borough of Kingston upon Thames wards of Berrylands, Chessington, Hook and Southborough, St Mark's and Seething Wells, Surbiton Hill, Tolworth East, Tolworth South, and Tolworth West.

1983–1997: The London Borough of Kingston upon Thames wards of Berrylands, Chessington North, Chessington South, Hook, St Mark's, Surbiton Hill, Tolworth East, Tolworth South, and Tolworth West.

The constituency was made up of the eastern part of the Royal Borough of Kingston upon Thames in south-west London, centred on the area of Surbiton.  In 1997, it was absorbed into the new and larger Kingston and Surbiton constituency after the Boundary Commission for England recommended that a seat be lost in the twinned boroughs of Kingston and Richmond.

Members of Parliament

Elections

Elections in the 1950s

Elections in the 1960s

Elections in the 1970s

Elections in the 1980s

Elections in the 1990s

See also
List of parliamentary constituencies in London

References 

Parliamentary constituencies in London (historic)
Constituencies of the Parliament of the United Kingdom established in 1955
Constituencies of the Parliament of the United Kingdom disestablished in 1997
Politics of the Royal Borough of Kingston upon Thames
Surbiton